Kok or KOK may refer to:

People
 Kok (surname), a Dutch or Chinese surname

Places
 Kok River, a river in Burma and Thailand
 Kokkola-Pietarsaari Airport's IATA code

Abbreviations
 , the National Coalition Party, Finnish political party 
 Kappa Omicron Kappa, the fraternity in the movie Sorority Boys
 Knock Out Kaine, a rock band from Lincoln, England
 Konkani language
 , the Christian Labour Confederation in the Czech Republic

Other 
 Kok, also known as nuchal hump, a head protrusion found on the flowerhorn cichlid fish
 King of Kings (kickboxing), a European kickboxing promotion

See also
de Kok, surname
Kwok